Henry Fitzherbert Austin (1 September 1874 – 18 January 1957) was a Barbadian cricketer. He played in eight first-class matches for the Barbados cricket team from 1897 to 1904.

See also
 List of Barbadian representative cricketers

References

External links
 

1874 births
1957 deaths
Barbadian cricketers
Barbados cricketers
People from Saint George, Barbados